Sears Seating is an American producer of seating for agricultural, construction, and material handling equipment, and heavy-duty, over the road trucks worldwide.  It was founded in 1855 by Isaac Howe Sears, remains headquartered in Davenport, Iowa and  has over 600 employees in the Quad Cities.

Sears' customers include John Deere, CNH, Caterpillar, Bobcat, Hyster, Yale, Freightliner and Komatsu.

Early products included harnesses, saddles and other leather / canvas goods, predominantly for farmers. In 1947, the firm began to produce tractor seats, introducing innovative mechanical suspension for them 18 years later. Truck seat production began in 1981.

Awards
 2007 John Deere Partner-level Supplier and Supplier of the Year

References

External links

Companies based in Iowa
American companies established in 1855
Manufacturing companies established in 1855
Scott County, Iowa
Davenport, Iowa
Companies based in the Quad Cities
1855 establishments in Iowa